In ultra-low-temperature physics, Sisyphus cooling, the Sisyphus effect, or polarization gradient cooling involves the use of specially selected laser light, hitting atoms from various angles to both cool and trap them in a potential well, effectively rolling the atom down a hill of potential energy until it has lost its kinetic energy. It is a type of laser cooling of atoms used to reach temperatures below the Doppler cooling limit. This cooling method was first proposed by Claude Cohen-Tannoudji in 1989, motivated by earlier experiments which observed sodium atoms cooled below the Doppler limit in an optical molasses. Cohen-Tannoudji received part of the Nobel Prize in Physics in 1997 for his work. The technique is named after Sisyphus, a figure in the Greek mythology who was doomed, for all eternity, to roll a stone up a mountain only to have it roll down again whenever he got it near the summit.

Method

Sisyphus cooling can be achieved by shining two counter-propagating laser beams with orthogonal polarization onto an atom sample. Atoms moving through the potential landscape along the direction of the standing wave lose kinetic energy as they move to a potential maximum, at which point optical pumping moves them back to a lower energy state, thus lowering the total energy of the atom. This description of Sisyphus cooling is largely based on Foot's description.

Principle of sisyphus cooling

Note that this counter propagation does not make a standing wave in intensity, but only in polarization. In the intermediate regions, there is a gradient elipticity of the superposed fields.

Consider, for example, an atom with ground state angular momentum  and excited state angular momentum . The  sublevels for the ground state are 

 

and the  levels for the excited state are 

 

In the field-free case, all of these energy levels for each J value are degenerate, but in the presence of a circularly polarized light field, the Autler-Townes effect, (AC Stark shift or light shift), lifts this degeneracy. The extent and direction of this lifted degeneracy is dependent on the polarization of the light. It is this polarization dependence that is leveraged to apply a spatially-dependent slowing force to the atom.

Typical optical pumping scheme

In order to have a cooling effect, there must be some dissipation of energy.  

The atom is now pumped to the  excited state, where it spontaneously emits a photon and decays to the  ground state. The key concept is that in the presence of  light, the AC stark shift lowers the  further in energy than the  state.

At this point, the atom is moving in the +z direction with some velocity, and eventually moves into a region with  light. The atom, still in its  state that it was pumped into, now experiences the opposite AC Stark shift as it did in - light, and the  state is now lower in energy than the  state. The atom is pumped to the  excited state, where it spontaneously emits a photon and decays to the  state. As before, this energy level has been lowered by the AC Stark shift, and the atom loses another  of energy.

Repeated cycles of this nature convert kinetic energy to potential energy, and this potential energy is lost via the photon emitted during optical pumping.

Limits
The fundamental lower limit of Sisyphus cooling is the recoil temperature, set by the energy of the photon emitted in the decay from the J' to J state. This limit is   though practically the limit is a few times this value because of the extreme sensitivity to external magnetic fields in this cooling scheme.

References

Nuclear physics
Cooling technology